Dylan Ryder (born February 23, 1981) is a former American pornographic actress.

Early life
Ryder was born in Fresno, California. She is of Italian and German descent. She has two younger sisters, Jocelyn and Jillian Lybarger, who are a mixed martial arts twin duo.

Ryder was a competitive swimmer and participated in water polo leagues from the time she was eight years old until her junior year in high school.

Ryder used to work as a drug and alcohol rehabilitation counselor for prison inmates in California. She was also a prison officer in Arizona.

Career
Ryder entered the adult film industry in 2004 around age 23. She came up with her stage name when she was looking through a pornographic magazine and saw the name "Dylan" and the phrase "Ride Her". She left the industry after six months and returned in 2008.

In March 2011, Bluebird Films signed Ryder to an exclusive performing contract. This contract ended in 2012. Later that year, Complex ranked her 52nd on their list of "The Top 100 Hottest Porn Stars (Right Now)".

Ryder co-hosted the 28th Annual XRCO Awards Show on April 19, 2012. After finishing second in the Miss Freeones competition, she announced her retirement from active involvement in the adult industry in May 2012, though she continues to operate her website.

Appearances
In 2011, Ryder began co-hosting a Playboy Radio online show with Alektra Blue.

Ryder has made several magazine appearances such as Australia's Picture and People, men's magazines Penthouse and Velvet, and the March 2012 issue of Maxim as "reason number 17 to watch UFC".

Other ventures
Ryder was a contributor to the 2010 book Porn - Philosophy for Everyone: How to Think With Kink where she co-authored Chapter One. Also in 2010, Ryder interviewed several female MMA fighters at a Tuff-N-Uff Amateur Fighting Championships event in Las Vegas for her website. Her sisters were competitors in the event.

Personal life
Her sisters Jill and Jocelyn Lybarger are MMA competitors.

Partial filmography

Awards and nominations

References

External links

 
 Twitter
 Instagram
 
 
 

1981 births
Actresses from Fresno, California
Actresses from Orange County, California
American people of German descent
American people of Italian descent
American pornographic film actresses
American prison officers
Living people
Pornographic film actors from California
21st-century American women